In wrestling, a bear hug, also known as a bodylock, is a grappling clinch hold and stand-up grappling position where the arms are wrapped around the opponent, either around the opponent's chest, midsection, or thighs, sometimes with one or both of the opponent's arms pinned to the opponent's body. The hands are locked around the opponent and the opponent is held tightly to the chest. The bear hug is a dominant position, with great control over the opponent, and also allows an easy takedown to the back mount position.

A variation of the bear hug is the inverted bear hug, where one wrestler has his hands locked behind his opponent's mid or lower back and presses his forehead into their sternum, while pulling his locked hands inwards towards himself, forcing his opponent to bend backwards and fall. It is a painful move as much pressure is being exerted onto the opponent's sternum, often hurting the back bones and muscles as well as forcing air out of the lungs. In professional wrestling, this move is most often used by wrestlers known for great upper body strength.

The move was used by Terrible Ted, an actual  bear which took part in wrestling exhibition matches in the USA and Canada between 1950 and 1975.

Other uses 
"Bear hug" was a term used in the 1970s for extremely close dancing, which sometimes was called "bump and grind".

In business, a "bear hug" is an unsolicited takeover bid which is so generous that the shareholders of the target company are very unlikely to refuse.

A "bear hug" is also known as an "icebreaker game" in which an odd number of people are divided into pairs, leaving one member without a partner. All players sit down in a large circle, one partner in front of the other. The player without a partner calls 2–5 names, depending upon the size of the group, of players sitting in the front. Those players then try to make their way to the player without a partner, while their partners attempt to hold them back. The match ends when a player reaches the individual who called the names. Players who were called and failed to reach the caller switch places with their partner so they are now in the back. The game often involves injuries due to the violent struggles between partners.

The song "Summertime Clothes" (2009) from Animal Collective was originally known as "Bearhug".

See also 
 Bear Hugger, a Super Punch-Out!! character
 Collar-and-elbow position
 Double collar tie
 Double underhooks
 Over–under position
 Pinch grip tie

References

Grappling hold
Wrestling